WIGY (1240 AM) is a radio station owned by Bennett Radio Group that is licensed to serve Lewiston, Maine. WIGY airs a classic hits radio format. Its programming is also heard on translator stations W239ET (95.7 FM) and W288CW (105.5 FM). In addition to music, WIGY broadcast Lewiston–Auburn area high school sports.

History

The station was assigned the WEZR call letters by the Federal Communications Commission on January 18, 2007. On March 31, 2014, WEZR began simulcasting on 105.5 FM, via translator W288CW, and rebranded as Z105.5. On August 1, 2016, the station began simulcasting on WEZR-FM (92.7, formerly WOXO-FM, whose country music format was transferred to 1450 AM and 96.9 FM), expanding the format's reach to the Oxford Hills area; as a result, the station rebranded to "Maine's Big Z". In April 2019, WEZR rebranded as "Z105.5 & 96.9", reflecting the move of its Oxford Hills simulcast from WEZR-FM to WOXO (now WPNO).

WEZR, along with its sister stations, went off the air March 29, 2020, citing financial considerations that included expected reduction in advertising revenue attributed to COVID-19. The stations had been up for sale following the death of owner Dick Gleason in February 2019. A sale of the Gleason Media Group stations to Bennett Radio Group was announced in May 2020.

Bennett Radio Group's purchase, at a price of $300,000, was consummated on August 5, 2020. On August 19, 2020, WEZR and WPNO returned to the air as they relaunched the hot AC format as "WIGY", while adding a simulcast on the former WTME (now WEZR). 1240 AM changed its callsign to WIGY on September 7, 2020.

Translator

References

External links
FCC History Cards for WIGY
Lewiston-Auburn community radio expands into FM

Classic hits radio stations in the United States
IGY (AM)
Radio stations established in 1938
1938 establishments in Maine